Ranishwara is a village development committee in Gorkha District in  Gandaki Province of northern-central Nepal. At the time of the 1991 Nepal census it had a population of 2,993 and had 580 houses in the town.

References

Populated places in Gorkha District